Anthony Roger Dorrien Wickson (born 1940) was headmaster of the King's School, Chester, where he served from 1981 until his retirement in 2000. Born and raised in Croydon, Wickson was educated at Whitgift School and Sidney Sussex College, Cambridge, where he read history. Narrowly missing out on national service, Wickson embarked upon a career as a teacher.  After undertaking a brief training period at Charterhouse School, he moved on to Ardingly College, where he taught contemporary notables, such as Ian Hislop. In a career that spanned four decades, Wickson taught in a number of southern schools before becoming head of Shaftesbury Grammar School and, thereafter, The King's School, Chester.

During his time at King's, Roger Wickson oversaw its extension, including the construction of a sports hall and extensions to the Junior School, and presided over the admission of girls into the Sixth Form in 1998.  The school's library, built in 2000, is named in his honour.

A renowned canal boat enthusiast, Wickson has been known to flex his entrepreneurial spirit by painting wooden stools and other canal boat paraphernalia, often for charity. He has also written a book on this topic: Britain’s inland waterways (London, Methuen; New York, Roy Publishers, 1968).

Wickson is also passionate about medieval history - notably the medieval Church and its monastic subsidiaries - and he continues to teach at Keele University.  He has written a book on medieval England: The community of the realm in thirteenth century England (London 1970).

Now retired, Roger Wickson is married to Sue with two children, Penelope and Andrew.

References

1940 births
Living people
People educated at Whitgift School
Alumni of Sidney Sussex College, Cambridge
English historians
Heads of schools in England